Pompeia was the name of several ancient Roman women of the gens Pompeia:
 Pompeia, the daughter of Quintus Pompeius consul 141 BC, who married a certain Gaius Sicinius
 Pompeia (sister of Pompeius Strabo), sister of General and Consul Gnaeus Pompeius Strabo, who was the father to Pompey
 Pompeia (sister of triumvir Pompey), sister of Pompey and daughter of General and Consul Gnaeus Pompeius Strabo
 Pompeia, the wife of Publius Vatinius, a tribune in 59 BC 
 Pompeia (wife of Julius Caesar), the second wife of Julius Caesar
 Pompeia (daughter of Pompey the Great) by his third wife, Mucia Tertia
 Pompeia (daughter of Sextus Pompeius), daughter of political rebel Sextus Pompeius and Scribonia
 Pompeia Macrina, a woman exiled by the Roman Emperor Tiberius in 33 AD
 Pompeia Paulina, wife of Seneca the Younger
 Pompeia Plotina, the wife of Roman Emperor Trajan
 Pompeia Macrina, one of the mothers-in-law of Roman historian and Senator Pliny the Younger
 Pompeia of Langoat, a Breton saint and queen

See also
Pompeius
Pompeius (disambiguation)
Pompeii (disambiguation)
Pompey (disambiguation)

Pompeii (Romans)
Ancient Roman prosopographical lists of women